Lechenaultia hirsuta, commonly known as hairy leschenaultia, is a species of flowering plant in the family Goodeniaceae and is endemic to the west of Western Australia. It is a straggling, low-lying shrub with few branches, fleshy leaves, and scarlet flowers.

Description

Taxonomy
Lechenaultia hirsuta was first formally described in 1868 by Ferdinand von Mueller in Flora Australiensis from specimens collected by James Drummond. The specific epithet (hirsuta) means "hirsute", referring to the whole plant.

Distribution and habitat
Hairy leschenaultia usually grows in low, open heath, and occurs between Kalbarri and Badgingarra in the  Geraldton Sandplains, Swan Coastal Plain and Yalgoo biogeographic regions of western Western Australia.

Conservation status
This leschenaultia is listed as "not threatened" by the Government of Western Australia Department of Biodiversity, Conservation and Attractions.

References

 heteromera
Plants described in 1867
Flora of Western Australia
Taxa named by Ferdinand von Mueller